The Asmara Circuit (formerly Circuit of Asmara) is a one-day cycling race held annually in Asmara, Eritrea since 2013. It is rated 1.2 and is part of UCI Africa Tour.

Winners

References

Cycle races in Eritrea
Recurring sporting events established in 2013
UCI Africa Tour races